Boknafisk (either from saami boahkkeguolli or Norwegian bokna "half dry") is a variant of stockfish and is unsalted fish partially dried by sun and wind on drying flakes ('hjell') or on a wall.

The most common fish used for boknafisk is cod, but other types of fish can also be used. If herring is used, the dish is called boknasild.

Boknafisk is mostly associated with Northern Norway, but it is eaten along the entire Norwegian coast down to Bergen.

See also

 List of dried foods

Norwegian cuisine
Dried fish
Fish dishes